Randall Building, originally an extension of the Randall Hotel, is a historic commercial building located in "The Landing" section of downtown Fort Wayne, Indiana. It was built in 1905, and is a large five-story, Renaissance Revival style brick building. For many years the building was occupied by Seavey Hardware.

It was listed on the National Register of Historic Places in 1990.

References

Commercial buildings on the National Register of Historic Places in Indiana
Commercial buildings completed in 1905
Renaissance Revival architecture in Indiana
Buildings and structures in Fort Wayne, Indiana
National Register of Historic Places in Fort Wayne, Indiana
1905 establishments in Indiana